Corah may refer to:
N. Corah & Sons, Leicester hosiery and textiles company
Nathaniel Corah (1777–1831), founder of N. Corah & Sons